Norman Thomas Patterson (27 October 1945 – 21 August 2012) was a Canadian international soccer player.

Born in Belfast, Northern Ireland, Patterson grew up in Quebec and played club soccer for St. Paul Rovers and Celtic Verdun. He represented Canada at the 1967 Pan American Games. He died from cancer in Toronto.

References

1945 births
2012 deaths
Association footballers from Belfast
Northern Ireland emigrants to Canada
Anglophone Quebec people
Soccer people from Quebec
Canadian soccer players
Canada men's international soccer players
Association football forwards
Pan American Games competitors for Canada
Footballers at the 1967 Pan American Games